The Real World: Las Vegas is the twenty-fifth season of MTV's reality television series The Real World, which focuses on a group of diverse strangers living together for several months in a different city each season, as cameras follow their lives and interpersonal relationships. It is the third season to be filmed in the Mountain States region of the United States, specifically in Nevada.

The season featured a total of eight cast members over the course of the season, as one cast member was evicted and replaced. It is the fifth season to take place in a city that had hosted a previous season, as the show's twelfth season was set in 2002. Las Vegas was first reported as the location for the 25th season by the website Vevmo on September 8, 2010. Pre-production started in August 2010, and filming took place from October to December 2010 at the Hard Rock Hotel and Casino. The season premiered on March 9, 2011, consisting of 13 episodes.

Director of the Nevada Film Office Charlie Geocaris commented, "The Nevada Film Office is very excited to have MTV’s The Real World return to Las Vegas. The first time here proved to be excellent exposure for the city and the NFO is always happy to assist any MTV production that visits our state."

Motocross racer Carey Hart makes a guest appearance in Episode 3.

Assignment
Most seasons of The Real World, beginning with its fifth season, have included the assignment of a season-long group job or task to the housemates, continued participation in which has been mandatory to remain part of the cast since the Back to New York season. In this season, the cast interns with a charity called the Athlete Recovery Fund, doing weekly assignments that included working at motorbike events.

The residence

A custom suite was built at the Hard Rock Hotel and Casino in Las Vegas, where the cast resided. Hard Rock President and Chief Executive Officer Joseph Magliarditi commented, "We are very excited to partner with MTV and their hit reality show series The Real World for the 25th season in Las Vegas...We look forward to hosting the new cast." The penthouse suite for the cast has a large set living room, four bedrooms, and built-in bowling alley.

Cast
This season, the capacity of the cast returns to a roster of seven, the first season to do so since the Hollywood season.
{| class="wikitable sortable" style="text-align:center;"
! scope="col"| Cast Member
! scope="col"| Age
! scope="col"| Hometown
|-
! scope="row" | 
| 22
| Falmouth, Maine
|- class="expand-child"
| colspan="3" align="left" | As a child, Adam had few friends and participated in few extracurricular activities, which led to his life as a drug dealer  beginning at age 14, and his arrest at 16 following a failed drug robbery  that included his active participation in a shooting. While there, he petitioned the governor of Maine to let him take college classes, and established the Creek to College program that encourages residents to pursue education. He recently graduated from the University of Southern Maine, where he ran track and ran for class president and majored in criminology and political science. He is a fan of the Boston Celtics and Taylor Swift, and currently has a girlfriend, Jordan, though he exhibits an attraction to his roommate Nany, beginning in Episode 1, which comes to fruition in Episode 4. MTV described him as "focused and determined when he wants to be", but his friends characterize him as a "loose cannon" who juggles his current girlfriend with his "secret girlfriend". He is evicted from the hotel in Episode 6 after repeatedly exhibiting destructive or disorderly behavior when drunk. He returns, however, in Episode 12.
|-
! scope="row" | 
| 24
| Rayne, Louisiana
|- class="expand-child"
| colspan="3" align="left" | Despite growing up in a small town, Dustin considers himself "a city boy at heart". Characterized by what MTV describes as a "boyish charm and southern gentleman demeanor", Dustin grew up with a bi-polar, drug addicted mom and an abusive stepfather. Although he was constantly shuttled between parents, relatives and various friends' houses, he worked hard to maintain relationships with his family, though his brother Quay visits in Episode 8. He worries as to whether he will develop bipolar disorder, from which his mother suffers. He once lived in the house featured on Fratpad, a live webcam site in which he and other men engage in sexual activities with one another, though he stresses that he is straight and did this purely for a living, and he hopes to put that past behind him. He further explains that his mother's Pentecostal beliefs precluded him from playing sports, and that not wanting to work in oil fields or sell drugs, he chose that line of work because of limited options. An avid fan of racing, his friends see him as a highly competitive young man whose good looks help him socialize with women. Although he initially expresses an aversion to romance with his housemates in the premiere, he later begins a romantic relationship with Heather in that same episode, but when she and the rest of the cast learn he has concealed a past, Heather breaks up with him, and the others feel betrayed.
|-
! scope="row" | 
| 21
| Delran, New Jersey
|- class="expand-child"
| colspan="3" align="left" | Heather grew up in a small town with a close-knit family and spent most of her adolescence living with her brother's struggle with brain cancer. Despite this, she was accepted into a gifted program in school but the neglect she felt by the constant attention paid to him led to alcoholism, and a bout of alcohol poisoning that landed her in the hospital at age 14. Though these problems have been resolved, she continues to harbor guilt over it.  She is currently majoring in Communications and Information Technology at Monmouth University. where she is reportedly a member of the Delta Phi Epsilon sorority and trained in first aid and yoga. As the first in her family to attend college, she is a strong advocate for student debt education and hosts a blog dedicated to the subject.
|-
! scope="row" | 
| 25
| Romulus, Michigan
|- class="expand-child"
| colspan="3" align="left" | Leroy was 10 years old when he and his sisters were removed from their birth mother for her alcoholism and drug abuse. His foster parents were strict, but he maintains a positive outlook on life, and credits his experiences for making him self-reliant. Originally from Michigan, he has worked for the past few years as a Dallas, Texas sanitation worker, and dreams of moving to California to become an actor or personal trainer. According to MTV, his friends see him as "an open, reliable guy who doesn't judge people based on their backgrounds", and is outgoing in his attempts to meet women. He exhibits an attraction to Naomi, which comes to fruition in Episode 4, though they continue seeing other people by the next episode.
|-
! scope="row" | Naomi also mentions Michael's full name as Michael Brian Ross when reciting her wedding vows to him in Act 4 of the season finale.
| 23Biography page for Michael Ross, MTV.com, accessed March 11, 2011.
| Nokesville, Virginia
|- class="expand-child"
| colspan="3" align="left" | As a child, Michael's parents were heavily involved in drugs and served jail time, which led to his moving between his grandparents, stepmother and father, beginning at age five.Mentioned or seen in Episode 2. In addition, he lived with mother's growing cancer threat while helping to raise his seven half-siblings. After attending St. Thomas Aquinas Regional School, a Catholic elementary school in Woodbridge, Virginia,St. Thomas Aquinas Regional School's official site, accessed November 24, 2010. he put himself through the University of Maryland, where he dual majored in Rhetoric and Agribusiness, and was the president of the UMD Students against National Healthcare. He is an outspoken libertarian and world hunger solution advocate, and describes himself as a "nerd". Having recently lost his virginity, he says he still has the same morals, eschews going to strip clubs, and looks for women with a compatible personality. Naomi characterizes Mike's intellectualism by remarking that she needs a thesaurus to understand him. Mike sees his biological mother, Tammy, who is in poor health following treatment for breast cancer, for the first time in two years when she visits in Episode 12.
|-
! scope="row" | 
| 21Biography page for Nany González, MTV.com, accessed March 11, 2011.
| Jamestown, New York
|- class="expand-child"
| colspan="3" align="left" | Nany is a Dominican woman who attended Jamestown Community College, where she majored in criminal justice. She grew up an athlete as well as Semi-Pro Cheerleader. Nany's father was jailed on drug charges before she was born, and having found letters several years old in her mother's closet addressed to her, she is determined to find him, with the support of her mother. She is further spurred to find her biological father after meeting a young homeless man who barely knew his father in Episode 10, and while she learns from a private investigator that she has a brother and sister through him, she is heartbroken to learn that he died in 2002, a year before she found his letters.
|-
! scope="row" | Mike also addresses Naomi by her full name when proposing to her, reading the prenuptial agreement and reciting his wedding vows in Acts 3 and 4 of the season finale.
| 22Biography page for Naomi Defensor, MTV.com, accessed March 11, 2011.
| The Bronx, New York
|- class="expand-child"
| colspan="3" align="left" | Naomi is a Puerto Rican/Portuguese American originally from New York who currently resides in Arizona. In 2010, she graduated from Buffalo State College where she majored in journalism, minored in political science and was a member of the Latin Sorority Lambda Theta Alpha. She hopes to obtain a Master's Degree in international politics at the University at Buffalo, and pursue a career as a news reporter or magazine columnist. She has also interned for several entertainment companies, and is an advocate for immigration and gay rights. Though she developed an "emotionally hard and defensive" personality from past conflicts with her mother, she is very close to her family, and is fond of watching movies and listening to music. Described by MTV as "self-reliant", a "firecracker" and "completely open about her life", she has had twelve sexual partners since attending college and regrets none of them. She and Leroy share a romantic night in bed in Episode 4, but resume seeing other people by the next episode.
|-
! scope="row" | 
| 21Biography page for Heather Cooke, MTV.com, accessed April 21, 2011.
| California, Maryland
|- class="expand-child"
| colspan="3" align="left" | Heather, who goes by her last name "Cooke", is the daughter of a U.S. Naval officer and a native Filipino mother. Their family is tight-knit, and includes an older brother and younger sister. Heather, who harbors a deep connection to her mother's heritage, is the president of her school's Asian Cultural Alliance. She is also Division 1 soccer player, and was a four-year women's soccer letter winner, an All-Metro Atlantic Athletic Conference First Team honoree, and a recipient of the Ernest Lagna and John R. Moller Awards. Explaining that she's a "fierce athlete" who "lives, eats and breathes soccer", she hopes to pursue pro soccer overseas, though she has also considered following in her father's foot steps and joining the Coast Guard. She graduated in 2010 from Loyola University Maryland, where she majored in international business, and prior to moving to Las Vegas, she worked in the Washington, D.C. areas as a junior program analyst. MTV describes her as "a man eater with frequent bi-curious tendencies" who engages in casual sex, though fears she will not find true love as her parents did. She moves into the suite in Episode 7, following Adam's eviction.
|}

 Duration of cast NotesAdam is removed from the house in Episode 6 after getting kicked out of the hotel following multiple incidents where he destroyed things throughout the hotel and had multiple violent outbursts.

Cooke replaced Adam in Episode 7.

Adam makes an appearance in Episode 12.

Episodes

After filming

The Real World: Las Vegas Reunion aired on June 8, 2011, and was hosted by Maria Menounos, featuring the entire cast, as they discussed their time during filming and their lives since the show ended.

Since filming, Leroy returned to his sanitation job in Dallas, while Heather returned to Monmouth University to pursue a major in TV communications. Naomi returned to Buffalo State College to pursue TV journalism, and keeps in touch with Nany, who returned to Jamestown, New York, where she works as a waitress, and hopes to pursue opportunities elsewhere. Cooke began working at a nuclear power plant in North Carolina, where she started a relationship with a man named Jacob. Michael returned to College Park, Maryland, and hopes to attend grad school for agricultural development, while Dustin returned to Louisiana, and stays active with his friends, physical activities and rides his motorcycle.

Cooke discussed her rough first impressions with her housemates when she moved into the suite, including a kiss with Dustin that was instigated by Leroy, which caused jealousy on Heather's part. An argument occurred when Mike accused Dustin of homophobia, after Dustin's past in gay porn was discussed. Heather stated she was still puzzled as to why Dustin kept further details about his past hidden. Dustin tried to offer a friendship to Mike, but was met with resistant by Mike, stating narcissism on Dustin's part. Leroy's promiscuity was discussed, with opinions by Naomi on his ability to maintain future relationships, though Leroy's "bromance" with Mike resulted in friendship bracelets. Also discussed were the Twitter wars amongst the housemates, with a preview of The Challenge: Rivals closing out the reunion. Following the reunion, it was revealed that Dustin and Heather had begun to live together.

Dustin and Heather continued their relationship when appearing on The Challenge: Battle of the Exes, and were cast members on the third season of Couples Therapy, in which they sought counseling for problems in their relationship stemming from issues of commitment and Dustin's past in gay pornography. In July 2013, Dustin was arrested on suspicion of sexual battery inside a Lafayette, Louisiana nightclub.

In 2014, Michael married Taylor Roberts. His former roommates Adam, Leroy, Cooke and Nany were in attendance at his wedding alongside Laurel Stucky from Fresh Meat II. The rest of the castmates who could not attend send him well wishes on Twitter.

Adam Royer moved to California and he is currently a law clerk and a father of two: Hudson and Harlow.

In 2017, Leroy Garrett appeared on Fear Factor. He was paired with Johnny Devenanzio from The Real World: Key West and competed against Aneesa Ferreira, Laurel Stucky and stars from MTV's Winter Break: Hunter Mountain. In 2019, he also appeared on Game of Clones looking for a J.Lo lookalike. In 2020, Garrett moved to Houston with Kam Williams from Are You the One?, whom he first met on season 31 of The Challenge. On May 17, 2022, their son Kingston Lee was born. After he stopped appearing on The Challenge, Garrett spoke about castmate Camila Nakagawa's racist outburst on season 30, and how he felt after the producers allowed her to remain in the competition after the fact.

Cooke was flown out to Argentina with the initial cast of The Challenge: All Stars to serve as an alternate in case anyone got disqualified. She was ultimately sent home after being unused. 

The Challenge
This is the fourth season of The Real World whose entire cast has at one time or another competed in MTV's spin-off reality series The Challenge. The first three are The Real World: Boston, The Real World: New Orleans and The Real World: Austin.

Challenges in bold''' indicate the cast member was a finalist on the Challenge.

References

External links
Official site at MTV.com
Cast biography page at MTV.com
The Real World seasons at MTV.com

2011 American television seasons
Las Vegas (2011)
Television shows set in the Las Vegas Valley
Hard Rock Hotel and Casino (Las Vegas)
Television shows shot in the Las Vegas Valley